Fletcher Joseph Loyer (born September 1, 2003) is an American college basketball player for the Purdue Boilermakers of the Big Ten Conference. As a true freshman for the 2022–23 Boilermakers, he won both a Big Ten regular season and a 2023 Big Ten men's basketball tournament championship, while earning All-Big Ten honorable mention individual recognition. During the season, he set the Purdue Freshman single-game three point shots made record (6).

He played high school basketball in Michigan at Clarkston High School for his freshman and sophomore seasons. Then, he attended Homestead High School in Indiana for his junior and senior seasons. As a senior, he was the 2022 Indiana Gatorade Player of the Year award winner and the 2022 Indiana Mr. Basketball runner-up.

Loyer is the son of basketball coach and scout John Loyer and brother of Foster Loyer, the 2018 Mr. Basketball of Michigan.

Early life and high school career
Loyer was born September 1, 2003, to John and Kate Loyer. His father played basketball at the University of Akron and his mom played volleyball at Indiana University, and was an assistant coach for Purdue volleyball. His grandfather, Al McFarland, played for Purdue Boilermakers men's basketball in 1964. 
The Loyer family moved for John's National Basketball Association career with the Portland Trailblazers, Philadelphia 76ers, New Jersey Nets and Detroit Pistons.  Loyer was an assistant coach for the Portland (2003-05), Philadelphia (2005-09) and New Jersey (2009-11) before taking on the same role with Detroit in 2011. He served as Pistons interim head coach for 32 games for the 2013-14 Pistons. He later joined the Los Angeles Clippers as a scout in 2016.

Clarkston years (2018–20)
Loyer initially attended Clarkston High School in Clarkston, Michigan. As a freshman he was a 2019 Detroit Free Press Michigan High School Athletic Association (MHSAA) Division I all-state honorable mention selection. Loyer averaged 22 points, 3.5 rebounds, and 3.1 assists per game during his sophomore season. He was a 2020 The Detroit News MHSAA Division I all-state first team selection. Clarkston was 21–1 with a 20-game winning streak when COVID-19 lockdowns shutdown the season. By May 2020, he had scholarship offers from Toledo, Detroit and Denver. On May 30, 2020, he received his first high major offer from Michigan. By July 1, he also had offers from Purdue and Nebraska.

Homestead years (2020–22)
Loyer's mother, Kate, is from Indiana (she had been a student athlete at McCutcheon High School). Loyer's had relatives in the Fort Wayne area, including many cousins and an aunt who was a volleyball coach at Concordia Lutheran High School. His family moved to Fort Wayne, Indiana after his sophomore year and by July 3, 2020, he enrolled at Homestead High School, the same high school as former Boilermaker, Caleb Swanigan. At Homestead, which had won the 2015 Indiana Class 4A state championship, he would join a team with class of 2021 Illinois Fighting Illini men's basketball recruit, shooting guard Luke Goode. Loyer switched from shooting guard to point guard when he moved. On November 23, 2020, Loyer committed to Purdue over a field of offers that included Michigan, Missouri, Nebraska, Notre Dame and Utah, At the time he was rated a three-star recruit and ranked 140th in the National class of 2022. He was later rated a four-star recruit. On December 29, 2020, Loyer posted a Homestead High School single-game scoring record with 50 points against Marion High School. After winning their first 25 games, top-ranked Homestead lost 60–49 in the regional semifinals to Carmel High School, the number 2 ranked team in the state, on March 13, 2023. Loyer had a game high 26 points, including 6 points that cut the deficit to 50–49 with 1:26 remaining. He averaged 24.4 points, 4.5 assists, and 4.9 rebounds per game during his junior season. 

Although Loyer's Homestead team in Indiana was upset in March, he was able to play a full season during his junior year. In Michigan, almost the whole season was lost. Indoor winter sports were suspended November 18, 2020. Indoor contact winter high school sports' (basketball, wrestling, hockey and competitive cheer) season were suspended until at least February 21, 2021 due to the pandemic.

On March 12, 2022, future Purdue teammate Braden Smith led his Westfield High School team to a 64–53 victory over Loyer and Homestead in the Indiana state Class 4A Regional matchup. Although Loyer posted 27 points and surpassed Swanigan for the school's single-season scoring record (726 points versus 702 points) it was not enough to overcome Smith's 13-point, 8-rebound, 6-assist, 3-steal, and 2-block effort. On March 16, Loyer was named the Indiana boy's basketball Gatorade Player of the Year as a senior after averaging 26.9 points, 5.3 rebounds, and 3.6 assists per game. After totalling 803 points in two season in Michigan, he totaled 1360 points in his two years at Homestead to finish with 2,163 points in his high school career. On March 29, Loyer won the national 3-point contest as part of the 2022 High School Slam Dunk and 3-Point Championships over Kyle Filipowski and Austin Montgomery. On April 2, Loyer was runner up for Indiana Mr. Basketball to Smith by a 128–109 vote. On April 4, he was one of 14 players selected to the 2022 Indiana All-Stars boys team, but declined the award.

College career
Loyer entered his freshman season at Purdue as a starter at guard. On November 28, 2022, Loyer was recognized as the Big Ten Freshman of the Week for averaging 12.3 points, 2.0 assists and 1.7 rebounds in three victories, including two over a pair of top-ten ranked opponents (14 points against No. 6 Gonzaga and 18 against No. 8/10 Duke), during Purdue's 2022 Phil Knight Invitational title run. The following day, CBSSports.com recognized Loyer as the first CBS Sports/USBWA National Freshman of the Week of the season. On December 5, he was named Big Ten Freshman of the Week when he averaged 15.5 points and 6.0 assists with no turnovers in another pair of wins. His career-high 20 points and eight rebounds against Minnesota was the first 20/8 performance by a Purdue freshman since Bruce Parkinson on March 10, 1973. When Purdue faced his brother's Davidson team on December 17, they won 69–61, and Fletcher outscored his brother 14–11. On January 5, he posted 11 second half points, including the game-winning go-ahead three point shot with 11 seconds remaining against Ohio State in Columbus, Ohio. On January 17, 2023, Loyer was recognized as both a Co-Big Ten Player of the Week and the Big Ten Freshman of the Week after he scored 27 points and established a Purdue Boilermaker freshman single-game three point shots made record with 6 with against Nebraska on January 13. Purdue won the 2022–23 Big Ten Conference men's basketball regular season championship (the school's 25th) as well as the 2023 Big Ten men's basketball tournament. Following the regular season, Loyer was selected by both the coaches and the media as an honorable mention All-Big ten selection. #1-seeded Purdue lost its 2023 NCAA Division I men's basketball tournament first round game to 23.5 point underdog Fairleigh Dickinson in Columbus, Ohio in the biggest upset in tournament history. Loyer, who scored Purdue's final 8 points, and who was part of a freshman backcourt (with Smith) that had 10 turnovers, missed a game-tying three point shot with 12.3 seconds left when he was pinned in the corner. The freshman backcourt pair of Smith and Loyer each started a school freshman record 35 games and finished the season as Purdue's 2nd highest scoring freshman duo (Loyer 384/Smith 340, 724 total) behind Robbie Hummel and E'Twaun Moore (813, 2008).

Personal life
Loyer's older brother, Foster, was Mr. Basketball of Michigan and played at Davidson after beginning his career at Michigan State. The Loyer family also has a daughter, Jersey, Fletcher's sister. Jersey is a high school class of 2024 volleyball player at Concordia High School.

References

External links
college stats at ESPN
Purdue Boilermakers bio

2003 births
Living people
American men's basketball players
Basketball players from Indiana
Basketball players from Michigan
Purdue Boilermakers men's basketball players